Ilse Bernheimer (born March 20, 1892, in Vienna, Austria-Hungary; died February 28, 1985, in Venice) was an Austrian painter, graphic artist, interior designer, and teacher.

Early life 
Born on March 20, 1892, Bernheimer's parents were Hermine Bernheimer, née Margulies (1864-1944) and the chemist Oskar Bernheimer (1858-1950). Elisabeth and Marianne Leisching were her cousins. In 1906 Ilse Bernheimer started studying with Franz Strohofer. Franz Čižek also became aware of Bernheimer's children's drawings. At the age of 16, she was allowed to participate in the youth section of the 1908 Vienna Art Show with 30 watercolors. From 1908 to 1910, she was a guest student at the Vienna School of Applied Arts. In 1913 she helped prepare for the International Women's Suffrage Conference in Vienna.  From 1911 to 1916 she studied painting with Kolo Moser, ornamental form with Franz Čižek, and Anton von Kenner and his assistant Oskar Kokoschka. Bernheimer also taught Francesco Grimaldi as a young artist.

Nazi persecution 
In 1938 after the Anschluss, she fled with her parents to Italy. They went into hiding in Rome in 1943.

Postwar 
From 1950 she lived in Venice, where she taught from 1952 at the Zanetti Glass School on Murano. She died in 1985.

Her work has been featured in recent exhibitions, such as the "City of Women - Female Artists in Wien during the years 1900 - 1938" at the Belvedere in Vienna in 2019.

Memberships 

 Österreichischer Werkbund
 Vereinigung bildender Künstlerinnen Österreichs

Exhibitions 

 1908: Kunstschau
 1920, 1928: Hagenbund
 1922, 1976: Biennale Venedig
 1928: Weihnachtsschau, Künstlerhaus Wien
 1932: 17. Jahresausstellung der Vereinigung bildender Künstlerinnen Österreichs, Hagenbund
 1966: Galerie Nagel
 1970: Instituto Austriaco di Cultura, Rom
 1982: Hochschule für Angewandte Kunst, Wien

Posthumous

 2019: "Stadt der Frauen"
 2021: "Die Frauen der Wiener Werkstätte." MAK – Museum für angewandte Kunst

Writings 

 Arbeiten in der Kunstgewerbeschule, Wien : Hochschule für Angewandte Kunst, 1982

Literature 

 Wien um 1900, Kunst und Kultur, (Ausstellungskatalog) Wien 1985, S. 497
 Rudolf Schmidt: Österreichisches Künstlerlexikon, Bd. 1, Wien 1980
  (abweichende biografische Daten)
 Veronika Volz: Nach Italien emigriert – drei Künstlerinnen und Künstler, (Walter Franke, Ilse Bernheimer, Maria Likarz-Strauß), in: Zwischenwelt. Zeitschrift für Kultur des Exils und des Widerstands (22), 1/2, 2005, S. 61–65.
 Christoph Thun-Hohenstein, Anne-Katrin Rossberg, Elisabeth Schmuttermeier (Hrsg.): Die Frauen der Wiener Werkstätte. MAK, Wien und Birkhäuser Verlag, Basel 2020, S. 207. ISBN 978-3-0356-2211-9

External links 

 sammlung.mak.at Biografie, MAK Sammlung online, retrieved 13 February 2022.

References 

1985 deaths
1892 births
Austrian designers
Austrian painters
Jewish emigrants from Austria after the Anschluss
Jewish artists
Austrian women artists
Jews who emigrated to escape Nazism